Rainism is the fifth Korean-language studio album from South Korean singer Rain, and the first album since his departure from JYP Entertainment.  The album was released on the October 15, 2008, in South Korea.  The first single taken from the album, Love Story, became another hit for Rain. The album was released in four formats throughout Asia.

Releases
Rainism was released in various formats throughout Southeast Asia.  The album was released with a new cover. Each version was released with the original track list as well as international versions of his two singles, ″Love Story″ and "Rainism", in English, Japanese and Chinese.

The album was re-released in South Korea on March 5, 2009.  The album was retitled, Rainism Recollection and packaged as a limited edition album with new album art.  The album was packaged as a three disc album.  The first disc containing original track listing (removing the original version of Rainism and replacing it with the clean version), the second disc included all international versions of his two singles, "Love Story" and "Rainism", in addition to several bonus acoustic tracks and a remix of the song Fresh Woman.  Disc 3 was a DVD including the music video for the first single Love Story.

Controversy
On November 24, 2008, The Commission of Youth Protection judged Rain's album, Rainism, inappropriate for people under 19 years old because of the song "Rainism". In "Rainism", the lyrics (translated from Korean) "Trembling inside your shaking body is my magic stick/Feeling the impassable limit of the body shake" became a problem, as "magic stick" had connotations of a penis. Rain re-released a "clean version" of "Rainism" shortly after, but instead of changing the original album's contents, the original song was still included on the soundtrack, but marked as inappropriate for those under 19 years old.

Singles
Rain released Love Story, as the first single from the album, shortly followed by the single, Rainism.  Both songs were re-recorded in four languages and served as that version for the appropriate country (an English version was issued to SE Asia radio).  It was stated that Fresh Woman would be released as a single, but proof of this has not appeared.  Rain performed the track, Only You, in support of the re-release of Rainism in South Korea.  However, Only You, is not an official single.

Promotion 
To promote the release, Rain went on a world tour. The tour began in Seoul and included stops in Japan, China, Singapore and Indonesia, for a total of 28 concerts in 9 countries.

Accolades
On December 10, 2008, Rainism received the Album Bonsang at the 23rd Golden Disc Awards. The title track "Rainism" additionally achieved the top spots on the music programs Inkigayo and M Countdown, and won the Best Asian Pop Song award at the 2009 Hito Music Awards.

Legend of Rainism Tour

In support of his 5th album Rainism, Rain kicked off his third concert tour titled "The Legend of Rainism Tour" in August 2009. It continued with concerts in Japan, Korea, Hong Kong, Indonesia, the United States and Taiwan.

Shows

Track listing

Charts

Release history

References 

Rain (entertainer) albums
J. Tune Entertainment albums
2008 albums
Korean-language albums